The following is a list of political parties in the Indian state of Tamil Nadu, on the national, state and regional levels.

Dravidian parties 
 Dravidar Kazhagam (DK)
 Dravida Munnetra Kazhagam (DMK)
 All India Anna Dravida Munnetra Kazhagam (AIADMK)
 Marumalarchi Dravida Munnetra Kazhagam (MDMK)
 Desiya Murpokku Dravida Kazhagam (DMDK)
 Amma Makkal Munnettra Kazagam (AMMK)

Congress parties 
 Indian National Congress (INC)
 Tamil Maanila Congress (Moopanar) (TMC(M))

Forward Bloc parties 
All India Forward Bloc (AIFB)
All India Forward Bloc (Subhasist) (AIFB-S)
Democratic Forward Bloc (DFB)
Desiya Forward Bloc (NFB)

Others 
Bahujan Samajwadi Party (BSP)
Abdul Kalam Vision India Party
Social Democratic Party of India
Indhiya Jananayaga Katchi
Aam Aadmi Party (AAP)
Bharatiya Janata Party (BJP)
Naam Tamilar Katchi (NTK)

Ambedkarite parties 
Ambedkar Makkal Iyakkam(AMI) 
Purachi Baratham Party

Communist parties 
Communist Party of India
Communist Party of India (Marxist)
Tamil Nadu Communist Party
Indhiya Jananayaga Katchi
Marxist Periarist Communist Party

Other regional parties 

All India Samathuva Makkal Katchi
Tamizhaga Makkal Munnetra Kazhagam (TMMK)
Tamizhaga Murpokku Makkal Katchi
Tamizhaga Vazhvurimai Katchi

Religious parties 
 Hindu Makkal Katchi
 Shiv Sena
 Tamil Nadu Muslim Munnetra Kazagham
 Indian Union Muslim League
 Manithaneya Makkal Katchi
 Indian Christian Front

Caste based parties 
 Puthiya Tamilagam
 Ahila India Naadalum Makkal Katchi
Perunthalaivar Makkal Katchi
 All India Moovendar Munnani Kazhagam
 Kamarajar Adithanar Kazhagam
 Kongu Desa Makkal Katchi
 Kongunadu Munnetra Kazhagam
 Kongunadu Makkal Desia Katchi
 Kongunadu Makkal Katchi
 Makkal Tamil Desam Katchi 
 Moovendar Munnetra Kazhagam
 Perunthalaivar Makkal Katchi
 Puthiya Needhi Katchi
 Pattali Makkal Katchi
Viduthalai Chiruthaigal Katchi

Agrarian parties 
 Uzhavar Uzhaippalar Katchi
 Indian Uzhavar Uzhaippalar Katchi

References 

Political parties in Tamil Nadu
Politics of Tamil Nadu
Tamil Nadu
Tamil Nadu politics-related lists